Carl N. Taseff (September 28, 1928 – February 27, 2005) was an American football player and assistant coach.

Early life and college
Taseff grew up in Ohio and went to college at John Carrol University in University Heights, Ohio, east of Cleveland, where he was a roommate and college football teammate of future Pro Football Hall of Fame coach Don Shula.

Professional career
Taseff was drafted in the twenty-second round of the 1951 NFL Draft by the Cleveland Browns, who also selected Shula in the ninth round. Both men made the team and were the only two rookies on the roster that year. Taseff was used sparingly as a rusher and receiver on offense and an occasional kick return man, as the Browns finished the season with a 11—1 win–loss record and advanced to the 1951 NFL Championship Game, which they lost to the Los Angeles Rams. The Browns released Taseff on waivers prior to the regular season, but he went unclaimed and the team added him to the roster when halfback Don Phelps was injured.

After spending one season with the Browns, he went to the Baltimore Colts and played for them for nine seasons.  While with the Colts he helped them win two NFL titles and played in the 1958 overtime title game against the New York Giants.

He set an NFL record with the Colts in 1959 by returning a blocked field goal 99 yards for a touchdown.  He finished his professional playing career in 1962 with the American Football League's Buffalo Bills.

Taseff later became a member of the coaching staff with Don Shula on the Dolphins (1970–1994).

NFL Coaching career
Taseff was an assistant coach on the Detroit Lions in the mid-1960s. He then joined his old friend and head coach of the Miami Dolphins Don Shula as a defensive backs coach from 1970 to 1993.

1964 Boston Patriots (DB)
1965–1966 Detroit Lions (DB)
1970–1974 Miami Dolphins (DB)
1975–1982 Miami Dolphins (DB/ST)
1983–1992 Miami Dolphins (DB)
1993 Miami Dolphins (AWR)

Death
A disease known as progressive supranuclear palsy, from which Taseff had been suffering for roughly six years, caused him to suffer from a weaker immune system.  At the end of January 2005, Taseff caught the common cold that would eventually develop into pneumonia which would take his life on February 27, 2005.

See also
 Other American Football League players

References

1928 births
2005 deaths
American football cornerbacks
Baltimore Colts players
Buffalo Bills players
Cleveland Browns players
Miami Dolphins coaches
Philadelphia Eagles players
John Carroll Blue Streaks football players
Boston Patriots (AFL) coaches
American Football League players